The International Ski Mountaineering Federation (ISMF) is the international governing body responsible for Ski mountaineering competitions. Its main aims are promotion, regulation, and development of Ski mountaineering worldwide. In 2026 the sport will be part of the programme of the Olympic Winter Games Milano Cortina 2026.

History 
The "International Council for Ski Mountaineering Competitions" (ISMC) was founded in 1999 as an internal body of the "Union Internationale des Associations d'Alpinisme" (UIAA). The ISMC was created to govern and administer the sport of Ski mountaineering, replacing the "Comité International pour le Ski Alpinisme de Compétition" (CISAC), which was founded in 1988 in Barcelona. On 6 October 2007, the General Assembly of the UIAA approved the new statutes, where the position of "unit member" was created. As a consequence of this change, it was deemed necessary to constitute an independent "international competition federation with its own juridical personality", named the "International Ski Mountaineering Federation" (ISMF). The Constitutional Assembly of the ISMF members held on 27 February 2008 in Champéry, Portes du Soleil (Switzerland), decided to continue to administer Ski mountaineering competitions as an International Federation with its own legal entity. 

Today the ISMF is a non-profit association with the legal headquarters in Lausanne and the administrative office in Mondovì (Italy).

Organisational structure 
The organisational structure of the ISMF has been significantly implemented since 2018. Today it can count on various internal commissions that determine and regulate its functioning according to the sector of reference: anti-doping, sustainability, medical, disciplinary, sport development, regulations. The organisational structure of the International Ski Mountaineering Federation consists of a Bureau, which includes the President, the Secretary General and three representatives of the main macro areas (Sport, Marketing and Communication, Finance), one of whom also covers the role of Vice-President. In turn, the Bureau is part of the Council, which, in addition to the aforementioned people, presents four representatives from member association, a representative of male athletes and a representative of female athletes and a representative for each continental council.

Disciplines 

 Team race: It deals with the most traditional form of Ski mountaineering competitions, since once only team events were present. The teams are composed by 2 or 3 athletes of the same sex and belonging to the same category to be valid for the purpose of the ISMF rankings. This type of race has to include at least 3 ascents and as many descents, even if in long distance races generally there are more. The competitions frequently transit on the crests of mountains, while the descents are off-piste. A standard team race lasts a maximum of 3 hours and covers a total altitude difference of about 2000m.
 Individual race: This type of competition is similar to the team one, but is based on a single athlete. It consists of at least 3 ascents and as many descents, but also a part on foot with skis carried in the backpack. Although ISMF events no longer use cables and harnesses, crampons may still be required for steeper, icier ascents. The races normally last from an hour and a half to two hours and can cover a total height difference of 1900m. The race start is always a mass start of all athletes together.
Sprint race: This is a mini Individual race, which combines the essential characteristics and techniques of Ski mountaineering between an ascent (including a part on foot with skis in the backpack) and a single descent from the top. As the name suggests, it is a very fast race that is based on completing the total track in about 3 minutes for the fastest athletes. The first round is an individual qualification with the athletes starting in succession every 20 seconds, after which the batteries of 6 people start. Although the ascent is usually on flat snow, the descent can be off-piste, with gates and small jumps.
Vertical race: From the name it is clear that the Vertical race is an event that involves a single and long ascent. It usually takes place on flat snow and entirely with skins under skis. It has not to exceed an altitude difference of 700m.
Relay race: This type of race takes place in teams of 3 or 4 athletes, who face on the "circuit" one after the other, competing one at a time. Also in this case it is a rather fast event, lasting about 15 minutes per circuit, which includes 2 ascents and as many descents and a short section with skis in the backpack. The total height difference is about of 150-180m.

ISMF competitions 

World Cups of Ski Mountaineering
World Championship of Ski Mountaineering
European Championship of Ski Mountaineering
Asian Championship of Ski Mountaineering
South American Ski Mountaineering Championship
North American Ski Mountaineering Championship
Series

Categories:
 U18 = 17/18 years (Cadets)
 U20 = 19/20 years (Juniors)
 U23 = 21/22/23 years (Espoirs)
 O21 = > 21 years (Seniors)

Organisations to which the ISMF belongs 

 SportAccord (GAISF) since 2010
 ARISF since 2014
 Provisional recognition as an Olympic Federation since 2014
 Olympic Federation since 2016

National Federations members 

In March 2022, due to the 2022 Russian invasion of Ukraine, the ISMF banned the participation of Russian and Belarusian athletes and officials in international competitions; it also canceled all events planned to take place in Russia.

See also 
 Ski mountaineering
 World Championship of Ski Mountaineering
 World Cups of Ski Mountaineering
 Ski orienteering

References

External links
 Official website

International sports organizations
Ski mountaineering
Sports organizations established in 2008